Makarov  is a Hasidic dynasty founded by the Rebbe Menachem Nochum Twerski of the Chernobyl dynasty. Makarov is the Yiddish name of Makariv, a town in present-day Ukraine. To this day, the Mekarev Shul is used in the old City of Safed for Shabbat Prayers by the Yeshiva Shalom Rav.

Lineage 
 Rebbe Menachem Nochum Twerski of Makarov (1805–1851), son of the Rebbe Mordechai Twerski of Chernobyl
 Rebbe Yaakov Yitzchok of Makarov (died 1892), son of the Rebbe Nochum.
 Dov Ber Tversky (2002-now), son of Reb Yaakov Yitzchok Tversky.

References 
 Encyclopedia of Jewish Life (2001), p. 786: "Makarov"Rebbe
 Shtetl Finder (1980), p. 53: "Makarov"
 Słownik Geograficzny Królestwa Polskiego (1880-1902), VII, pp. 922-926: "Makarów" (Polish)

External links
History of Makarov rebbes by Zalman Shklyar (Moscow)  (Russian)
The Mekarev Shul in Tzfat website

Chernobyl (Hasidic dynasty)
Hasidic dynasties